Joe Dassin (commonly called Le Costume blanc after the fourth track on side 1 or Ça va pas changer le monde after the first track on side 2) is the ninth French studio album by Joe Dassin. It came out in 1975 on CBS Disques.

Commercial performance 
The album was a big seller for CBS.

It reached number 1 in France.

Track listing

References

External links 
 

1975 albums
Joe Dassin albums
CBS Disques albums

Albums produced by Jacques Plait